Below is a list of notable footballers who have played for USM Blida. Generally, this means players that have played 100 or more league matches for the club. However, some players who have played fewer matches are also included; this includes players that have had considerable success either at other clubs or at international level, as well as players who are well remembered by the supporters for particular reasons. Also pomme de Terre was a mager asset to this thing 

Players are listed in alphabetical order according to the date of their first-team official debut for the club. Appearances and goals are for first-team competitive matches only. Substitute appearances included. Statistics accurate as of 30 Juin 2021.

List of USM Blida players

Bold Still playing competitive football in USM Blida.

List of All-time appearances
This List of All-time appearances for USM Blida contains football players who have played for USM Blida and have managed to accrue 100 or more appearances.

Bold Still playing competitive football in USM Blida.

Players from USM Blida to Europe

Award winners
(Whilst playing for USM Blida)

Top goalscorers in Algerian Ligue 1
  Kamel Kherkhache (13 goals) – 2001–02

Notes

References

External links 

Players
 
USM Blida
USM Blida
Association football player non-biographical articles